Theresa Serrano (born January 25, 1994) is an American professional wrestler. She is currently signed to WWE, where she performs on the NXT brand under the ring name Zoey Stark, and is a former NXT Women's Tag Team Champion.

Professional wrestling career

Early career (2012–2020)

On June 8, 2013, Serrano made her debut at Vendetta Pro Wrestling, losing to Hudson Envy. On November 16, 2013, she entered under the ring name Lacey Ryan and won her first match against Larry Butabi. During this time she also won the UCW-Zero Ultra-X Championship. She was able to keep this until January 25, 2014, when she lost it to The Durango Kid. On March 22, she wrestled her last wrestling match for the time being. Ryan celebrated her comeback on August 16, 2018. She wrestled a match against Thunder Rosa, but this ended in a no contest. On May 23, 2019, she wrestled a match against Alex Gracia under the ring name Serrano, which she was able to win. On September 29, she won the FSW Women's Championship, defeating Taya Valkyrie for the title. Ryan held the title until November 20, 2020, when she lost it to Mazzerati.

WWE (2021–present)
On January 20, 2021, it was announced that Serrano had signed a contract with WWE. On the January 29 episode of 205 Live, Serrano, now renamed Zoey Stark, made her debut as Marina Shafir's tag team partner in the Women's Dusty Rhodes Tag Team Classic tournament, losing to Ember Moon and Shotzi Blackheart in the first round. On the February 17 episode of NXT, she made her NXT debut, defeating Valentina Feroz. On the February 24 episode of NXT, she lost to NXT Women's Champion Io Shirai in a non-title match. After the match, Shirai embraced Stark, establishing Stark as a face. At NXT TakeOver: Stand & Deliver, Stark defeated Toni Storm. At The Great American Bash, Stark and Io Shirai defeated The Way (Candice LeRae and Indi Hartwell) to win the NXT Women's Tag Team Championship. They lost the titles to Toxic Attraction (Gigi Dolin and Jacy Jayne) at Halloween Havoc in a triple-threat tag team Scareway To Hell Ladder Match, also involving Indi Hartwell and Persia Pirotta. On the November 2 episode of NXT, Stark was attacked backstage by Jayne and Dolin, where she suffered a legitimate torn MCL/Meniscus. 

On the July 19, 2022, episode of NXT, Stark made her return from injury in the 20-Woman Battle Royal for the Number One Contendership for the NXT Women's Championship in a winning effort. On the November 8 episode of NXT, Stark and Nikkita Lyons failed to win the NXT Women's Tag Team Championship from Kayden Carter and Katana Chance. After the match, Stark attacked Lyons, turning heel for the first time in her career.

On January 28, 2023, Zoey Stark entered her first Royal Rumble match at #13 lasting 26:34, scoring no eliminations before being eliminated by Sonya Deville.

Championships and accomplishments
Future Stars Of Wrestling
FSW Women's Championship (1 time)
 Pro Wrestling Illustrated
 Ranked No. 86 of the top 150 female wrestlers in the PWI Women's 150 in 2021
Ultra Championship Wrestling-Zero
NWA UCW-Zero Ultra X Championship (2 times)
 WWE
 NXT Women's Tag Team Championship (1 time) – with Io Shirai

References

External links
 
 Zoey Stark at Online World of Wrestling
 
 
 

1994 births
Living people
Professional wrestlers from Utah
American female professional wrestlers
NXT Women's Tag Team Champions
21st-century American women
21st-century professional wrestlers